Katsuhiko Kinoshita (born 1973) is a Japanese team handball coach. He coaches the Australian national team, and participated at the 2011 World Women's Handball Championship in Brazil.

References

1973 births
Living people
Japanese handball coaches
Australian handball coaches